NSE may refer to:

Stock exchanges 

 Nagoya Stock Exchange, Japan
 Nairobi Stock Exchange, Kenya
 Nigerian Stock Exchange, Lagos
 National Stock Exchange of India (NSE), Mumbai, India
 National Stock Exchange, the former name of Vilnius Stock Exchange, Lithuania

Transportation
 Network SouthEast, a former sector of British Rail
 North–South Expressway (Malaysia)
 North–South Expressway, Singapore
 Norwegian Air Sweden, a Swedish low-cost airline

Education 
 Norwegian School of Economics, a business school in Bergen, Norway
 National Spanish Examinations, an online assessment for students studying Spanish as a second language in the United States
 National Student Exchange, an exchange program for American and Canadian undergraduate students

Computing
Namespace Shell Extension, see shell extension
Network Search Engine, a device that helps computer network routers accelerate one of the most common functions: searching for patterns/addresses in data packets
Network Software Environment, an early project aware revision control system implemented on top of the Source Code Control System
Nmap Scripting Engine, a feature of the Nmap security scanner that allows users to write (and share) simple scripts

Science
 Navier–Stokes equations, describing motion of fluid substances
 Neuron-specific enolase, is an enzyme used to identify neuronal cells and cells with neuroendocrine differentiation
 Neutron spin echo, an spectroscopic method, using inelastic neutron scattering
 Nash Sutcliffe model efficiency coefficient, a statistical index

Other uses 
 National Support Element, a military term for a supply and support unit deployed primarily in Hungary
 National Society for Epilepsy, a United Kingdom-based epilepsy charity
 New Schubert Edition, a 20th–21st century edition of the complete works of Franz Schubert
 Non-Speaking Extra, an extra
 NSE: Net Sphere Engineer, a 2004 manga by Tsutomu Nihei
 Nu Skin Enterprises, a direct selling multi-level marketing company

te:ఎన్‌ఎస్‌ఈ